Korrab (also Romanized as Korrāb; also known as Korab) is a village in Harzandat-e Gharbi Rural District, in the Central District of Marand County, East Azerbaijan Province, Iran. At the 2006 census, its population was 528, in 145 families.

References 

Populated places in Marand County